The 1989 Michigan Wolverines football team was an American football team that represented the University of Michigan as a member of the Big Ten Conference during the 1989 NCAA Division I-A football season. In its 21st and final season under head coach Bo Schembechler, the team compiled a 10–2 record (8–0 against conference opponents), won the Big Ten championship, lost to USC in the 1990 Rose Bowl, outscored opponents by a total of 335 to 184, and was ranked No. 7 and No. 8, respectively, in the final AP and UPI polls.

The team's statistical leaders included quarterback Michael Taylor with 1,081 passing yards, tailback Tony Boles with 839 rushing yards, and split end Greg McMurtry with 711 receiving yards, and placekicker J.D. Carlson with 73 points scored.

Defensive back Tripp Welborne was a consensus first-team selection to the 1989 All-America college football team. Six Michigan players received first-team honors on the 1989 All-Big Ten Conference football team.

Season
The Wolverines lost their season opener to Notre Dame but won ten consecutive games to finish the regular season. Highlights of the winning streak included the defeat of Minnesota by 34 points for the Little Brown Jug and a victory over Ohio State in their home finale.

The team leaders included running back Tony Boles, who rushed for 839 yards, and Michael Taylor, who threw for 1,081 yards. Greg McMurtry was the Wolverine's leading receiver with 41 catches for 711 yards. Schembechler retired after the Rose Bowl, which the Wolverines lost to USC by a touchdown.

Schedule

Personnel

Season summary

Notre Dame

at UCLA

Maryland

Wisconsin

at Michigan State

at Iowa

Indiana

Purdue

at Illinois

at Minnesota

Ohio State

Todd Plate's second interception of the day with 2:48 left in the game sealed the game and the Big Ten title for the Wolverines.

Rose Bowl (vs USC)

    
    
    
    
    

The 1990 Rose Bowl was a  rematch of the previous Rose Bowl in which Michigan won 22 to 14. Prior to the contest, Bo Schembechler had announced he would retire. 
USC scored the first points in the second quarter with a one-yard run by Todd Marinovich. Michigan got a field goal to make it 7 to 3 but the Trojans added another field goal before the half to take a 10 to 3 lead at halftime. Although Michigan tied the score, Ricky Ervins had a fourteen-yard touchdown run which clinched the Rose Bowl for the Trojans.

Player stats

Awards and honors
All-Americans: Tripp Welborne
All-Conference: Tony Boles, J.D. Carlson, Dean Dingman, Derrick Walker, Tripp Welborne
Most Valuable Player: Tony Boles
Meyer Morton Award: Chris Calloway
John Maulbetsch Award: Steve Everitt
Frederick Matthei Award: Dean Dingman
Arthur Robinson Scholarship Award: Tim Williams
Dick Katcher Award: Mike Teeter
Hugh Rader Jr. Award: Derrick Walker
Robert P. Ufer Award: Chris Calloway

Professional football
The following players were claimed in the 1990 NFL Draft.

A total of 25 players from the 1989 team went on to play professional football.  They are Bobby Abrams (New York Giants 1990-91, Cleveland Browns 1992, New York Giants 1992, Dallas Cowboys 1992-93, Minnesota Vikings 1993-94, New England Patriots 1995), Derrick Alexander (Cleveland Browns 1994–95, Baltimore Ravens 1996–97, Kansas City Chiefs 1998–01, Minnesota Vikings 2002), Erick Anderson (Kansas City Chiefs 1992-93, Washington Redskins 1994-95), Tony Boles (Dallas Cowboys 1991; San Antonio Riders 1992), Jarrod Bunch (New York Giants  1991–93, Los Angeles Raiders 1994), Corwin Brown (New England Patriots 1993–96, New York Jets 1997–98, Detroit Lions 1999–00), Chris Calloway (Pittsburgh Steelers 1990-91, New York Giants 1992-98, Atlanta Falcons 1999, New England Patriots 2000), Joe Cocozzo (San Diego Chargers 1993-97), Tom Dohring (Kansas City Chiefs 1992), Matt Elliott (Washington Redskins 1992, Carolina Panthers 1995-97), Steve Everitt (Cleveland Browns 1993-95, Baltimore Ravens 1996, Philadelphia Eagles 1997-99), Elvis Grbac (San Francisco 49ers 1993-96, Kansas City Chiefs 1997-00, Baltimore Ravens 2001), Leroy Hoard (Cleveland Browns 1990-95, Baltimore Ravens 1996, Carolina Panthers 1996, Minnesota Vikings 1996-99), Desmond Howard (Washington Redskins 1992-94, Jacksonville Jaguars 1995, Green Bay Packers 1996, Oakland Raiders 1997-98, Green Bay Packers 1999, Detroit Lions 2000-02), Burnie Legette (New England Patriots 1993-94), Tony McGee (Cincinnati Bengals 1993-01, Dallas Cowboys 2002-03, New York Giants 2003), Greg McMurtry (New England Patriots 1990-93, Chicago Bears 1994), Doug Skene (New England Patriots 1994), Greg Skrepenak (Los Angeles/Oakland Raiders 1992-95, Carolina Panthers 1996-97), Buster Stanley (New England Patriots 1994, Rhein Fire 1996-97, Grand Rapids Rampage 1999-00), Mike Teeter (Indianapolis Colts 1990, Frankfurt Galaxy 1991, Minnesota Vikings 1991, Houston Oilers 1993–94, Carolina Panthers 1995), Brian Townsend (Cincinnati Bengals 1992), Jon Vaughn (New England Patriots 1991-92, Seattle Seahawks 1993-94, Kansas City Chiefs 1994), Derrick Walker (San Diego Chargers 1990-93, Kansas City Chiefs 1994-97, Oakland Raiders 1999), and Tripp Welborne (Minnesota Vikings 1992).

References

External links
  1989 Football Team – Bentley Historical Library, University of Michigan Athletics History

Michigan
Michigan Wolverines football seasons
Big Ten Conference football champion seasons
Michigan Wolverines football